Investigator may refer to:

Occupations

Government and law
Detective, a person who investigates crimes, can be a rank and job in a police department, state or federal employee, or a civilian called a private detective
Inspector, a police rank in many countries

Science and academia
Clinical investigator, an investigator involved in a clinical trial
New investigator, a designation for less experienced researchers
Principal investigator, a researcher in a research project

Other fields
Private investigator, a person who does not work for the police or government, but who undertakes investigations as a subcontractor
Ghost hunter or other paranormal investigator
Psychic detective, a person who investigates crimes by using purported psychic abilities
 In Mormon missionary terminology, an investigator refers to someone who is investigating the LDS Church. Generally, a non-member who is taking the missionary discussions.

Media
 Investigator (magazine), journal of the Geelong Historical Society
The Investigator, a 1954 Canadian radio play
The Investigator (TV pilot), a 1973 British TV pilot
The Investigator: A British Crime Story, a British television documentary

Ships 
 HMS Investigator, name of ships in the Royal Navy
 RV Investigator, Australian research vessel built in 2013

Places

Australia
 Investigator Group, archipelago in South Australia
 Investigator Marine Park, a marine protected area in South Australia
 Investigator Strait, a strait in South Australia

See also
 Investigation (disambiguation)
 Investigator Group (disambiguation)
 The Investigators (disambiguation)